Magnus Fruergård Pedersen (born 23 November 1996) is a Danish footballer who plays as a right back.

Club career

OB
At the age of 18, Pedersen was moved to the first team squad in the summer 2015.

Pedersen got his debut for OB on 16 August 2015. Pedersen started on the bench, but replaced Mohammed Diarra in the 75nd minute in a 2-3 defeat against Randers FC in the Danish Superliga.

Loan to Sogndal
On 1 April 2016 he signed a loan deal with Tippeligaen-side Sogndal.

Sogndal
On 6 June 2016 it was confirmed, that Pedersen permanently had signed with Sogndal. After only 4 games from start in 2016, Pedersen was set to leave the club. Pedersen sat on the bench in 16 games without coming on and was not in the squad for five games.

After he came back from Elverum at the end of the 2017 season, Sogndal confirmed on 18 January 2018, that Pedersen had resigned his contract, to move back to Denmark. After leaving Norway, he began training with Danish 1st Division club FC Fredericia.

Loan to Elverum
On 24 March 2017 he signed a loan deal with Elverum Fotball in OBOS-ligaen stretching to the summer. He was replacing an injured Stian Lund.

Middelfart G&BK
After a one-week trial at FC Fredericia, Pedersen signed a two-year contract with Danish 2nd Division Middelfart G&BK on 3 February 2018.

Tarup-Paarup IF
On 26 July 2019, Pedersen moved to Denmark Series club Tarup-Paarup IF.

References

External links
 
 Magnus Pedersen on DBU

1996 births
Living people
Danish men's footballers
Danish Superliga players
Danish 2nd Division players
Eliteserien players
Norwegian First Division players
Odense Boldklub players
Sogndal Fotball players
Elverum Fotball players
Tarup-Paarup IF players
Danish expatriate men's footballers
Denmark youth international footballers
Association football defenders
Expatriate footballers in Norway
Danish expatriate sportspeople in Norway
Middelfart Boldklub players